Harry Davenport may refer to:
 Harry Davenport (actor) (1866–1949), American film and stage actor
 Harry Davenport (footballer) (1900–1984), Australian footballer
 Harry J. Davenport (1902–1977), Democratic Party member of the U.S. House of Representatives from Pennsylvania
 Harry Davenport (British politician) (1833–1895), British barrister and member of parliament
 Harry Bromley Davenport (born 1950), English film director and producer

See also
 Harold Davenport (1907–1969), mathematician